= The VIP List =

American restaurant critic duo

The VIP List is an American restaurant critic duo composed of Meg Radice and Audrey Jongens, who are active on the video sharing platform TikTok.

== Early life and education ==
Radice and Jongens became friends in high school.

After college, Jongens worked as a hostess while Radice worked for a wealth management firm.

== Online presence ==
The duo began posting on TikTok in early 2020, where they quickly gained a following posting reviews of nightclubs; they later switched to reviewing restaurants. The two ultimately quit their jobs to focus on TikTok full time. By October 2021 they had accumulated 366,000 followers; by February 2022, this had increased to 387,000 followers.

== Personal life ==
Radice and Jongens live in NYC.
